The 1987 New Zealand general election was a nationwide vote to determine the shape of the 42nd sitting of the New Zealand Parliament. The governing New Zealand Labour Party, led by Prime Minister David Lange, was re-elected for a second term, although the Opposition National Party made gains. The election also saw the elimination of the Democratic Party (formerly the Social Credit Party) from Parliament, leaving Labour and National as the only parties represented.

It marked the first time that a Labour Government had been reelected to a second term since 1938 and the first to be reelected overall since 1946.

Background
Before the election, the Labour Party (in government) held 56 seats, giving it an absolute majority in Parliament. The National Party (in opposition) held 37 seats. The Democrats, a small party devoted to the principles of Social Credit, held two seats. The 1985 Timaru by-election, triggered by the death of sitting MP Sir Basil Arthur had resulted in National winning the seat from Labour.

Of particular importance in the election were the economic reforms being undertaken by Roger Douglas, the Minister of Finance. These reforms, sometimes known as "Rogernomics", involved monetarist approaches to controlling inflation, corporatisation of government departments, and the removal of tariffs and subsidies. All these things were strongly opposed by many traditional Labour supporters, who saw them as a betrayal of the party's left-wing principles. Many commentators believed that public anger over Rogernomics could cost the government the election.

Another matter of importance, and perhaps one which enabled Labour to survive public dissatisfaction, was the nuclear issue. In the previous parliamentary term, New Zealand had adopted legislation which prevented nuclear weapons or nuclear-powered ships entering New Zealand, a move which provoked an angry reaction from New Zealand's allies in the ANZUS treaty. The National Party intended to revoke the ban, but the New Zealand public were supportive of it. Labour's support for the ban is often considered to be an important factor in the party's re-election.

National was also bitterly divided, with some supporting the Rogernomics reforms, but MPs such as former Prime Minister Robert Muldoon bitterly opposed. Muldoon had undermined his successor as party leader, Jim McLay, who was replaced by his deputy Jim Bolger in 1986. Bolger was more centrist, but National still struggled to be seen as an alternative government.

MPs retiring in 1987
Six National MPs and six Labour MPs intended to retire at the end of the 41st Parliament.

Electoral changes
The 1987 electoral redistribution took the continued population growth in the North Island into account, and two additional general electorates were created, bringing the total number of electorates to 97. In the South Island, the shift of population to Christchurch had continued. Overall, three electorates were newly created (and ), three electorates were recreated (and ), and four electorates were abolished (Hauraki, and ). All of those electorates were in the North Island. Changes in the South Island were restricted to boundary changes.

Election day
The election was held on 15 August, and 2,114,656 people were registered to vote. Turnout was 89.1%, somewhat lower than the 1984 election.

Summary of results
The election saw the Labour Party win 57 seats, enough for it to retain its outright majority. Labour held two more seats than after the previous election. The National Party won 40 seats, an increase of three. It was possible for both parties to increase their number of seats partly due to the disappearance of the Democrats and partly due to the increase in the total number of seats. This is the most recent election where only the two major parties, Labour and National won every seat in the House of Representatives.

Although Labour emerged from the election with a 17-seat lead over National, the difference between each party's vote count was considerably smaller. Labour's share of the vote was 48.0% (up from 43.0% in 1984), while National's was 44.0% (up from 35.5%). While Labour did retain its lead, the gap between Labour and National closed by a larger extent than the seat count would indicate.

The Democrats, despite winning 5.7% of the total vote, did not win any electorates, including the two that they had held before the election. The Democrats have not regained parliamentary representation under their own name since losing it in these elections, although they did manage to enter parliament as part of the larger Alliance in 1996.

The New Zealand Party, which had gained 12.2% of the vote in the previous election, performed poorly, gaining less than 0.3% support.

Electoral petition
The election night result for Wairarapa was for National by 65 votes. The final official count later gave the seat to the incumbent, Reg Boorman of the Labour Party, by a margin of seven votes, but a judicial recount reduced that to only one vote. But on 12 July 1988, following a petition to the Electoral Court, Wyatt Creech of the National Party was declared elected by a margin of 34 votes (9,994 to 9,960). The petition was supported initially by MPs Roger McClay and Winston Peters (who had been involved in challenges in Taupo and Hunua) but not by the party hierarchy, according to Creech's account in a book by Ross Meurant).

Detailed results

Party totals

Votes summary

There were 97 seats being contested, two more than were in the previous parliament. All seats were won by one of the two major parties.

The Labour Party, which was in government, won 57 seats, giving it a majority. Most of the seats won by Labour were in urban areas, following the party's typical pattern. Labour was particularly strong in the Wellington region, where it won all ten urban seats. It was also strong in Auckland, Christchurch and Dunedin, the other three urban centres, as well as in smaller cities such as Hamilton, New Plymouth, Nelson, Napier, Hastings and Palmerston North. Labour also retained its traditional dominance in the Maori seats, winning all four by large margins.

The National Party, also following its traditional patterns, was strongest in rural areas, winning the vast majority of seats in these regions. The party's primary wins in urban areas were in Auckland, with the party taking six seats. The party also won a number of seats in smaller cities, such as Rotorua, Tauranga, Invercargill and Whangarei. The party performed poorly in the Maori electorates, coming third in all four.

While no minor parties managed to win an electorate, several did manage to gain second place, outperforming one of the major parties but being defeated by the other. The Democrats (formerly Social Credit) was the strongest of the minor parties, coming second in five electorates. Two electorates, East Coast Bays and Pakuranga, were held by the Democrats prior to the election, but were narrowly lost to National candidates. In the other electorates (Coromandel, Rangitikei and Wanganui) the Democrats were the challengers. In the four Maori electorates, the Mana Motuhake party gained second place. Its best result, 31.6%, was obtained in Northern Maori. The New Zealand Party also performed strongly in some electorates, although not as strongly as in the previous election.

Independent candidates did not perform well in the 1987 election, with none of them winning a seat or even placing second.

The tables below shows the results of the 1987 general election:

Key

|-
 |colspan=8 style="background-color:#FFDEAD" | General electorates
|-

|-
|colspan=8 style="background-color:#FFDEAD" | Māori electorates
|-

|}
Table footnotes:

Notes

References

 
1980s in New Zealand
1987 in New Zealand
1987 elections in New Zealand
August 1987 events in New Zealand